The women's duet was one of two events in the synchronized swimming program at the 1992 Summer Olympics. The final was held on 7 August 1992.

The preliminary phase consisted of a technical routine and a free routine. The scores from the two routines were added together and the top 8 duets qualified for the final.

The final consisted of one free routine, the score from the final free routine was added to the score from the preliminary technical routine to decide the overall winners.

Results

Qualification

Final

References

1992
1992 in women's sport
Women's events at the 1992 Summer Olympics